XHCHZ-FM is a radio station in Chiapa de Corzo, Chiapas. Broadcasting on 107.9 FM, XHCHZ-FM is owned by the Instituto Mexicano de la Radio and broadcasts a music and information format under the name "Radio Lagarto".

History
In the mid-1980s, an accord between IMER and the government of Chiapas led to the establishment of three new IMER stations: XERA-AM in San Cristóbal de las Casas, XECAH-AM in Cacahoatán and XEMIT-AM in Comitán. In 1990, this was split, and XERA stayed with the government of Chiapas while XECAH and XEMIT remained with IMER. As a replacement, XECHZ-AM 1560 took to the air in 1991. XECHZ broadcast with 4.5 kW of power (due to an older transmitter), increasing its power to 20 kW with a new transmitter in 1994.

In 2012, XHCHZ-FM 107.9 was signed on as part of the AM-FM migration campaign currently underway among Mexican radio stations.

XHCHZ broadcasts in HD Radio
HD2 is a simulcast of XEB-AM.
HD3 is a simulcast of XEQK-AM.

References

Radio stations established in 1987
Radio stations in Chiapas